

The following lists events that happened during 1941 in Afghanistan.

Under its enlightened monarch Zahir Shah the country is advancing steadily in education and in the industries which are expected to exercise a civilizing influence on its turbulent people. But endeavours to stir up trouble are not lacking. The ex-emir Amanullah is hanging on to the other side of the frontier and is believed to be under Nazi orders to foment disaffection. The faqir of Ipi, an old campaigner among the tribes, is also intriguing. The king, however, is most correct in his neutrality, and his handling of the German colony in the country in the closing months of the year gives proof of his sincerity. German nationals organized themselves as a foreign branch of the Nazi party, and were developing active pro-Hitler propaganda on the approved fifth-column lines. Their position was one of some strength; they were employed as experts in economic development and in education, as engineers and as suppliers of machinery and plant for industrial enterprises. On British representations, however, the government orders the deportation of all German and Italian nationals; and a considerable danger to British India is thus averted. During the year, Sir Francis Verner Wylie succeeds Sir William Fraser-Tytler as British minister at Kabul.

Incumbents
 Monarch – Mohammed Zahir Shah
 Prime Minister – Mohammad Hashim Khan

November 1941
The king, Zahir Shah, formally opens the Loya jirga (Grand Council). The foreign minister takes the opportunity to reiterate the government's determination to maintain neutrality and to follow a peaceful policy.

See also
Other events of 1941

References

 
Afghanistan
Years of the 20th century in Afghanistan
Afghanistan
1940s in Afghanistan